Hersvikbygda is a village in Solund Municipality in Vestland county, Norway. The village is the site of Hersvik Church, which serves the northern part of the municipality.

References

Villages in Vestland
Solund